Mariano de Nicolò (22 January 1932 – 11 April 2020) was an Italian Roman Catholic bishop.

De Nicolò was born in Cattolica, Italy, and was ordained to the priesthood in 1955. He served in several offices with the Roman Curia. He served as a Papal Master of Ceremonies for the Office for the Liturgical Celebrations of the Supreme Pontiff from 1967 to 1984 and as Undersecretary of Pontifical Council for the Interpretation of Legislative Texts from 1984 to 1989.

Leaving the Roman Curia in 1989, Pope John Paul II appointed de Nicolò bishop of both the Diocese of Rimini and the Diocese of San Marino-Montefeltro in persona episcopi, and he was consecrated a bishop by Cardinal Rosalio José Castillo Lara. In 1995, Bishop de Nicolò left the Diocese of San Marino-Montefeltro, leaving it to Paolo Rabitti, whom he co-consecrated a bishop. He remained bishop of Rimini until his retirement 2007.

He died in Monte Tauro on Holy Saturday, 11 April 2020, at the age of 88.

Notes

1932 births
2020 deaths
20th-century Italian Roman Catholic bishops
21st-century Italian Roman Catholic bishops
Bishops appointed by Pope John Paul II